Smoko Mount is a mountain on East Falkland, Falkland Islands. "Smoko" is Falkland Islands English for a smoking break.

References

Mountains of East Falkland